NGC 6440 is a globular cluster in the constellation Sagittarius and was discovered by William Herschel on 28 May 1786. It has an apparent magnitude of about 10, with a diameter of about 6 arcminutes, and its Shapley–Sawyer Concentration Class is V.

References

External links
 
 NGC 6440

Globular clusters
Sagittarius (constellation)
6440